Charles Burroughs is the Interim Chair and Elsie B. Smith Professor of Liberal Arts in the Department of Classics at the Case Western Reserve University. He is an art historian specialising in late- and post-medieval Europe. He is an alumnus of Balliol College, Oxford University and the Warburg Institute, University of London and was previously Professor of Art History, Director of CEMERS at Binghamton University.

Selected publications 

Burroughs, C. (1990). From signs to design: Environmental process and reform in early Renaissance Rome, Cambridge, Mass: MIT Press.

References 

Living people
Case Western Reserve University faculty
Binghamton University faculty
Year of birth missing (living people)